CX157 (proposed trade name TriRima, formerly Tyrima) is a selective and reversible inhibitor of MAO-A (RIMA). As of 2007 it was in phase II clinical trials for the treatment of depression. In 2013, work on the drug was terminated.

References

Reversible inhibitors of MAO-A
Monoamine oxidase inhibitors
Abandoned drugs
Sulfur heterocycles
Trifluoromethyl compounds
Fluoroarenes
Sulfones